James Andrew House (born March 22, 1955) is an American country music artist. Originally a member of a group called the House Band, he recorded a solo rock album in 1983 on Atlantic Records before he began his country music career in 1989 on MCA Records, recording two albums for that label. He later penned singles for Diamond Rio and Dwight Yoakam, before finding another record deal on Epic Records in 1994. That year, he charted two Top 40 singles on the Billboard country chart, including the Top 10 hit "This Is Me Missing You".

Biography
James House's musical career began in a band called the House Band, which was signed first to Warner Bros. Records and later to Atlantic Records. In addition, House served as vocal coach for Dustin Hoffman on the movie Ishtar. In 1983, House recorded a rock album for Atlantic.

House later moved to Nashville and signed as a solo artist on MCA Nashville in 1989. On that label, he recorded two albums: James House and Hard Times for an Honest Man. The former accounted for "Don't Quit Me Now", a number 25 on the country charts, while the latter produced no Top 40 hits. House wrote seven of the ten songs on his first album.

After exiting MCA, he co-wrote "Ain't That Lonely Yet" for Dwight Yoakam and "In a Week or Two" by Diamond Rio, both of which peaked at number 2 on the Hot Country Singles & Tracks chart in the early 1990s. By 1994, House had signed to Epic Records. His first album for that label, Days Gone By, was released that year, producing his highest-charting single in the top 10 "This Is Me Missing You". The album's title track, while not a single, was featured in the soundtrack for the movie The Cowboy Way. In addition, the album featured collaborations with Raul Malo, Trisha Yearwood and Nikki Nelson.

Although House never entered Top 40 on the country music charts again after "This Is Me Missing You", he made an appearance on The Beach Boys' album Stars and Stripes Vol. 1, which featured re-recordings of Beach Boys songs with country music artists. He also continued to write songs for other artists. In late 1997, Martina McBride reached the top of the country charts with "A Broken Wing", which House co-wrote. House also contributed three songs to Steve Holy's debut album Blue Moon. He also co-wrote six songs on Steve Azar's 2009 album Slide On Over Here, on which he also played acoustic guitar, percussion and sang backing vocals. In 2012, House co-wrote The Mavericks' single "Born to Be Blue".

In 2012, House formed the duo Troubadour Kings with John Brannen. Their debut album, Heartache Town, was released in June 2012.

Discography

Albums

Extended plays

Singles

As lead artist

As featured artist

Music videos

Notes

References

1955 births
Musicians from Sacramento, California
American country singer-songwriters
Epic Records artists
MCA Records artists
Living people
Singer-songwriters from California
Country musicians from California